The 2009 Arizona State Sun Devils baseball team represented Arizona State University in the 2009 NCAA Division I baseball season. The Sun Devils played their home games at Packard Stadium, and played as part of the Pacific-10 Conference. The team was coached by Pat Murphy in his fifteenth season as head coach at Arizona State.

The Sun Devils reached the College World Series, their twenty-first appearance in Omaha, where they finished tied for third place after recording a pair of wins against North Carolina and losing two to eventual runner-up Texas.

Personnel

Roster

Coaches

Schedule and results

References

Arizona State Sun Devils baseball seasons
Arizona State Sun Devils
College World Series seasons
Arizona State
Arizona State Sun Devils baseball
Pac-12 Conference baseball champion seasons